Richard Gabriel may refer to:

 Richard P. Gabriel (born 1949), expert on the Lisp programming language
 Richard S. Gabriel (born 1952), West Indian cricketer
 Richard A. Gabriel, historian and author
 Richard L. Gabriel (born 1962), a Justice of the Colorado Supreme Court

See also
Gabriel Richard (1767–1832), French Roman Catholic priest and founder of the University of Michigan